Ministry of Science, Technology and Environment (1976) is the government body for sustainable and broad based economic growth contributing to employment generation and poverty reduction in Nepal.

References

Science, Technology, Environment
Nepal
Nepal
Environmental agencies in Nepal